Lonesome Traveler is an album by pianist Ray Bryant recorded and released by Cadet Records in 1966.

Reception

Flophouse magazine stated: "Lonesome Traveler is one of pianist Ray Bryant’s grittiest recordings and his second album on Cadet – the subsidiary of Chicago blues and r&b label Chess. ...By 1966, Bryant, a pianist with a lot of gospel and blues feeling and an uncommonly firm, propulsive left hand had a satisfactory decade to look back upon".

Track listing 
All compositions by Ray Bryant, except where indicated.
 "Lonesome Traveler" (Lee Hays) – 3:14
 "'Round Midnight" (Thelonious Monk, Cootie Williams, Bernie Hanighen) – 6:03
 "These Boots Were Made for Walkin'" (Lee Hazlewood) – 3:36
 "Willow Weep for Me" (Ann Ronell) – 5:14
 "The Blue Scimitar" (Esmond Edwards) – 4:22
 "Gettin' Loose" – 3:42
 "Wild Is the Wind" (Dimitri Tiomkin, Ned Washington) – 4:30
 "Cubano Chant" – 4:10
 "Brother This 'N' Sister That" – 4:43

Personnel 
Ray Bryant – piano
Snooky Young – trumpet 
Clark Terry – trumpet, flugelhorn 
Jimmy Rowser (tracks 2, 4, 5 & 8-9), Richard Davis (tracks 1, 3 & 6) – bass
Freddie Waits – drums

References 

1966 albums
Ray Bryant albums
Cadet Records albums
Albums produced by Esmond Edwards